Below is a partial list of television specials that were previously aired on the Philippine television networks ABS-CBN, Kapamilya Channel and A2Z.

For the currently aired programs, see the List of programs broadcast by Kapamilya Channel and List of programs broadcast by A2Z (Philippine TV channel).

ABS-CBN

Election coverage
 Halalan '67 (November 14−15, 1967)
 Halalan '69 (November 11−12, 1969)
 Halalan '71: Bilang ng Bayan (November 8−9, 1971)
 Bilang ng Bayan '87 (May 11−12, 1987)
 Bilang ng Bayan '88 (January 18–19, 1988)
 Halalan '92 (May 11−12, 1992)
 Halalan '95 (May 8−9, 1995)
 Halalan '98: The ABS-CBN Election Coverage (May 11−12, 1998)
 Halalan 2001 (May 14−15, 2001)
 Halalan 2004 (May 10−11, 2004)
 Halalan '07: Boto Mo, I-Patrol Mo! (May 14−15, 2007)
 Boto Mo, I-Patrol Mo! Halalan 2010: Ako ang Simula (May 10−11, 2010)
 Bayan Mo, I-Patrol Mo! Halalan 2013: Tayo Na (May 13−14, 2013)
 Halalan 2016: Ipanalo ang Pamilyang Pilipino (May 9−10, 2016)
 Halalan 2019: Ipanalo: Boses ng Pilipino (May 13−14, 2019)

International events
 Miss Universe on ABS-CBN (1969, 1994, 2007–2020)
 The Oscars on ABS-CBN (2008–2014)

Sports coverage
 Asian Games (1954–1970)
 Southeast Asian Games (1993–2011, 2019)
 1968 Summer Olympics (October 13−28, 1968)
 1992 Summer Olympics (July 26−August 10, 1992)
 2007 Boxing World Cup (Philippines vs. Mexico)
 2013 UCI Road World Championships
 2019 Southeast Asian Games: The Opening Ceremony (November 30, 2019)
 AFC Football World Cup 1st Qualifying Finals Manila: Philippines Azkals vs. Sri Lanka Brave Reds (July 10, 2011)
 AFC Football World Cup 2nd Qualifying Finals Kuwait: Philippines Azkals vs. Kuwait (July 23, 2011)
 AFC Football World Cup 2nd Qualifying Finals Manila: Philippines Azkals vs. Kuwait (July 28, 2011)
 A Run for the Pasig River Special Coverage (2009–2020)
 Bernard Hopkins vs. Winky Wright (July 23, 2007)
 Bowl Championship Series on ABS-CBN (1999–2002)
 2014 FIBA Basketball World Cup (2014)
 Homecoming: Oscar De La Hoya vs. Steve Forbes (May 4, 2008)
 Invasion: (Philippines vs. the World) Boxing Fight (2008)
 Kapamilya All Star Basketball/Volleyball Game (October 6, 2013)
 Laban Na Banal Boxing Coverage (July 26, 2008)
 Battle In Palawan (April 11, 2010)
 Manny Pacquiao fights
 vs. Erik Morales II (January 22, 2006)
 vs. Óscar Larios  (July 3, 2006)
 vs. Erik Morales III  (November 18, 2006)
 vs. Floyd Mayweather Jr. (May 3, 2015)
 vs. Lucas Matthysse (July 15, 2018)
 vs. Keith Thurman (July 21, 2019)
 MBA Games (1998–2001)
 MPBL Finals
  2019 MPBL Datu Cup Finals Davao Occidental Tigers Vs. San Juan Knights Game 2 (April 13, 2019)
 MICAA Games/MICAA on ABS-CBN (1957)
 NBA Games (2011–2019)
 NBA All-Star Games (2011–2019)
 NBA on ABS-CBN (2011–2019)
 2011 NBA playoffs
 2011 NBA Finals
 2012 NBA playoffs
 2012 NBA Finals
 2013 NBA playoffs
 2013 NBA Finals
 2014 NBA playoffs
 2014 NBA Finals
 2015 NBA playoffs
 2015 NBA Finals
 2016 NBA playoffs
 2016 NBA Finals
 2017 NBA playoffs
 2017 NBA Finals
 2018 NBA playoffs
 2018 NBA Finals
 2019 NBA playoffs
 2019 NBA Finals
 NFL on ABS-CBN (1986–1987)
 NFL Super Bowl XXI (January 26, 1987)
 Nonito Donaire fights
 vs. Omar Andres Narvaez (2011)
 vs. Fernando Montiel (Ang Pagtutuos) (2011)
 vs. Wilfredo Vázquez Jr. (Welcome To The Future Double Header) (2012)
 vs. Jeffrey Mathebula (2012)
 vs. Toshiaki Nishioka (2012)
 vs. Jorge Arce (The Demolition Day) (December 16, 2012)
 vs. Guillermo Rigondeaux (April 14, 2013)
 vs. Vic Darchinyan (The Rematch) (November 10, 2013)
 vs. Cesar Juarez (December 13, 2015)
 Number One-Numero Uno: Floyd Mayweather Jr. vs. Juan Manuel Márquez (September 20, 2009)
 PBL Opening Ceremonies Coverage (November 7, 2003)
 Peligro: The Humberto Soto-Urbano Antillion Fight (December 5, 2010)
 Philippines vs The Rest of the World Boxing Fight (2010)
 Pinoy Power 3: Latin Fury: Nonito Donaire Vs. Manuel "Chango" Vargas Boxing Fight (February 14, 2010)
 Pinoy Pride fights (2010−2016)
 Pinoy Pride 2: Melindo Vs. Tamara Boxing Fight (November 28, 2010)
 Pinoy Pride 3: The Rematch: "Boom Boom" Bautista Vs. “Zorrito” Barrera Boxing Fight (January 30, 2011)
 Pinoy Pride 4: Philippines vs The World: AJ Banal Vs. Francis Miyeyusho Boxing Fight (March 20, 2011)
 Pinoy Pride 5: Battle Of Champions: Donnie Nietes Vs. Armando Vasquez Boxing Fight (April 10, 2011)
 Pinoy Pride 7: The AJ Banal vs. Tyson Cave Boxing Fight (July 31, 2011)
 Pinoy Pride 8: Philippines vs. Mexico: Milan Melindo Vs. Francisco Rosas Boxing Fight (September 11, 2011)
 Pinoy Pride 9: Donnie Nietes vs. Ramon "Principe" Garcia Boxing Fight (October 9, 2011)
 Pinoy Pride 10: Rey "Boom Boom" Bautista vs. Miguel Angel Mendoza Boxing Fight (December 11, 2011)
 Pinoy Pride 11: Philippines Vs. The World: Milando Melino Vs. Juan “Panterita” Esquer Boxing Fight (January 29, 2012)
 Pinoy Pride 13 (March 25, 2012)
 Pinoy Pride 14: Night of Champions (June 3, 2012)
 Pinoy Pride 16 (September 20, 2012)
 Pinoy Pride 17: Banal vs. Sor Singyu (October 2012)
 Pinoy Pride 22: The Revenge (October 26, 2013)
 Pinoy Pride 23: Filipinos Kontra Latinos (December 1, 2013)
 Pinoy Pride 24: The Future Is Now: Genesis Servania vs. Alexander Munoz (March 2, 2014)
 Pinoy Pride 25: The Rematch For Glory: Donnie Nietes vs. Moises Fuentes (May 11, 2014)
 Pinoy Pride 33: Philippines vs. The World (October 18, 2015)
 Pinoy Pride 35: The Stars of the Future (February 28, 2016)
 Rambulan sa Macau 2: Milan Melindo vs. Juan Francisco Estrada Fight (July 28, 2013)
 Sandugo: The AJ Banal vs. Big Yoo Boxing Fight (July 18, 2010)
 Stadium Slugfest: Yuri Foreman vs. Miguel Cotto Fight (June 2010)
 Star Olympics 2007
 The Challenge: Bernabe Concepcion vs. Juan Manuel Lopez Fight (July 11, 2010)
 The World Awaits Oscar De La Hoya vs. Floyd Mayweather Jr. (May 6, 2007)
 Top Pro Boxing (1969−1972)
   UAAP Season 63 Opening Ceremony  (July 25, 2000)
 UAAP Finals
 UAAP Season 73 Men's Basketball Finals: Ateneo Vs. FEU Game 1 (September 25, 2010)
 UAAP Season 74 Men's Basketball Finals: Ateneo Vs. FEU Game 1 (September 24, 2011)
 UAAP Season 74 Men's Basketball Finals: Ateneo Vs. FEU Game 2 (October 1, 2011)
 UAAP Season 75 Men's Basketball Finals: Ateneo Vs. UST Game 1 (October 6, 2012)
 UAAP Season 76 Men's Basketball Finals: UST Vs. DLSU Game 2 (October 5, 2013)
 UAAP Season 76 Men's Basketball Finals: DLSU vs. UST Game 3 (October 12, 2013)
 UAAP Season 76 Women's Volleyball Finals: Ateneo vs. DLSU Game 4 (March 15, 2014)
 UAAP Season 77 Men's Basketball Finals: FEU vs. NU Game 1 (October 4, 2014)
 UAAP Season 77 Women's Volleyball Finals: Ateneo vs. DLSU Game 2 (March 14, 2015)
 UAAP Season 78 Men's Basketball Finals: UST Vs. FEU Game 2 (November 28, 2015)
 UAAP Season 79 Men's Basketball Finals: DLSU vs. Ateneo Game 1 (December 3, 2016)
  UAAP Season 79 Women's Volleyball Finals: DLSU vs. Ateneo Game 2 (May 6, 2017)
 UAAP Season 80 Men's Basketball Finals: Ateneo vs. DLSU Game 1 (November 25, 2017)
 UAAP Season 80 Men's Basketball Finals: Ateneo vs. DLSU Game 3 (December 4, 2017)
 UAAP Season 81 Men's Basketball Finals: UP vs. Ateneo Game 1 (December 1, 2018)
 UAAP Season
82 Men's Basketball Finals: UST vs.
Ateneo Game 1 (November 16, 2019)
 Ultimate Fighting Championship (2012–2015)
 UFC sa ABS-CBN: Mark Munoz: The Filipino Fighter (June–July 2012)
 UFC 179: Aldo vs. Mendes 2 (October 26, 2014) 
 UFC 192: Cormier vs. Gustafsson (October 4, 2015) 
 Welcome To The Future Double Header: The Nonito Donaire vs. Wilfrido Vasquez & Julio Cesar Chavez Jr. Vs. Marco Antonio Rubio Boxing Fight (February 5, 2012)
 WBC Welterweight Championship: Floyd Mayweather Jr. vs. Ricky Hatton (December 9, 2007)
 Z Gorres vs. Luis Melendez (November 15, 2009)

TV specials
 20 Taong ng Pagpapatrol: TV Patrol 20th Anniversary Documentary Special (November 25, 2007)
 30 630: Kwento ng DZMM: The DZMM 30th Anniversary Documentary Special (October 9, 2016)
 47th Box Office Entertainment Awards (May 1, 2016)
 ABS-CBN Breaking News: 9/11 Attack Special Coverage (September 11–16, 2001)
 ABS-CBN Chinese New Year Countdownecial (2010–2012)
 ABS-CBN Foundation's 20th Anniversary TV Special (2009)
 A Journey for the Youth: The 1995 ABS-CBN Papal Visit Coverage (January 10–15, 1995)
 A Salute to the King of Pop: Michael Jackson's 30th Anniversary Concert (2009)
 Agosto Bente-Uno: Ang Pagpatay kay Ninoy Aquino (August 25, 2013)
 AG From the East: The Unexpected Concert (September 13, 2015)
 Agila: Laban ng Lahi (June 14, 2015)
 Ako ang Simula: Himig Ng Pagbabago: ABS-CBN Election Special (October 15, 2009)
 Ako ang Simula: Simula Ng Pagbabago: ABS-CBN Election Special (June 14, 2009)
 Alay Ni Da King: An ABS-CBN Tribute Documentary Special (2007)
 Ambisyon 2010 TV Special (March 7, 2010)
 Andrea Bocelli Live In Manila TV Special (2004)
 Ang Babae ng Balangiga (January 20, 2019)
 Ang Pagbabalik Ng Bituin (March 1, 1987)
 Ang Kwento Nating Dalawa, Juday-Ryan Wedding Part 2 (May 24, 2009)
 Angel on Earth: 18th Birthday Special (2004)
 ANNEKAPAL The Forbidden Concert (June 7, 2015)
 Araw Values Awards (2008–present)
 As 1: The Experience TV Special (August 2010)
 ASAP Live in Dubai (February 2 and 9, 2014)
 ASAP 20 Live at the Mall of Asia Arena (February 22 – March 1, 2015)
 ASAP Live in New York (September 11−18, 2016)
 ASAP Live in Toronto (August 6–13, 2017)
 ASAP Birit Queens at the SM Mall of Asia Arena (December 10, 2017)
 ASAP Live in Honolulu (July 8–22, 2018; Part 2 delayed from July 15, 2018, due to Manny Pacquiao vs Lucas Matthysse fight)
 ASAP Live in Sydney (October 28, 2018)
 Asia Music Song Festival Philippines (2000)
 Bagsik ni Bagyong Yolanda: The ABS-CBN News and Current Affairs Special Coverage (November 2013)
 Banal: An ABS-CBN News Documentary on Blessed John Paul II (2011)
 BMPM, Ako ang Simula: Himig ng Pagbabago Concert TV Special (February 21, 2010)
 Bantay Bata 163's 10th Anniversary Special (2007)
 Barry Manilow: Greatest Hits Tour Live in Manila (December 6, 1992)
 Batas Militar (September 21, 1997, re-aired February 25, 2016)
 Bayaning Pilipino, Ang Simula ng Pagbabago TV Special (February 2010)
 Be Careful with My Heart: The Fairytale Wedding of Richard Lim and Maya dela Rosa (November 15, 2013)
 Be Careful with My Heart: Our Fairytale Wedding: The Happy Ever After Begins (November 24, 2013)
 Bea's Wildest Dreams @ 18 (October 2005)
 Beyond Conspiracy: 25 Years after the Aquino Assassination (2008)
 Bida ng Buhay Ko: The 20 Years of Judy Ann Santos TV Special (2006)
 Bigating Pagbabago: The Biggest Loser Pinoy Edition Doubles Primer (February 1, 2014)
 Bigating Pinoy: The Biggest Loser Primer (May 15, 2011)
 Bigating Simula: The Road To The Biggest Loser Pinoy Edition (May 29, 2011)
 Binibining Pilipinas (1995–1997; 2011–2020)
 Binibining Pilipinas: The Road to the Crown Primer (2011–2020)
 Black Eyed Peas Live in Manila (August 2006)
 Blackout: Bench's Denim and Underwear Special (July 19, 2009)
 Born for You LIVE! The Concert Finale (September 16, 2016)
 Bruno Mars: 24K Magic Live at the Apollo (January 7, 2018)
 Catholic Mass Media Awards (1998)
 Cheche Lazaro Presents (Produced by Unlimited Productions, Inc., 2011–2014)
 Ang Tunay na Pag-Ibig ni Lolo Jose (June 19, 2011)
 EDSA (February 2012)
 Sigalot (June 17, 2012)
 Bigatin (August 19, 2012)
 Bisyo (September 9, 2012)
 Plastic Ka! (September 23, 2012)
 Tekkie nga ba o Teka muna? (February 3, 2013)
 Kamag-anak, Inc.: A KampanyaSerye Documentary (March 10, 2013)
 Ang Tipo Kong Kandidato: A KampanyaSerye Documentary (May 12, 2013)
 Si Sir Chief, Si Maya at ang Teleserye (June 16, 2013)
 Pantawid sa Daang Matuwid (July 21, 2013)
 Ang Wika Ko (August 18, 2013)
 Cocorakot (September 15, 2013)
 LGBT (October 13, 2013)
 Andres Bonifacio: May Pagasa (November 24, 2013)
 Panahon Na! (January 12, 2014)
 Palibhasa Babae (March 2, 2014)
 Hapag ng Pagasa (April 20, 2014)
 Pinoy Hits (May 18, 2014)
 Kapag Tumibok ang Puso (June 22, 2014)
 Christmas and New Year Healing Eucharist Mass (December 25, 2007 – December 25, 2019 ; January 1, 2008 – January 1, 2020)
 Close Up Lovapalooza 2007 (February 10, 2007)
 Countdown to 2010: The ABS-CBN Leadership Forum (2009)
 Crying for Justice: The Maguindanao Massacre Media Forum (November 2010)
 Dalawang Mukha ng Malnutrisyon (July 27, 2008)
 Daniel Live! Concert TV Special (June 30, 2013)
 Daniel Padilla's Most Wanted Concert (October 11, 2015)
  'Di Ka Pasisiil (August 13, 2017)
 Diyes sa Mayo Diyes Election Special (May 9, 2010)
 DocuCentral Presents: Alab (March 30, 2019)
 DocuCentral Presents: Alpas (April 6, 2019)
 Dolce Amore: Choose Love Finale Concert (August 21, 2016)
 Dolphy Alay Tawa: A Musical Tribute to the King of Philippine Comedy (September 30, 2012)
 Dolphy: Hari ng Komedya (July 15, 2012)
 Eat Bulaga!: Moving On (A Special Musical Extravagenza) Live! at the Araneta Coliseum) (February 18, 1989)
 EDSA 1986: Mga Tinig ng Himagsikan (February 26, 2006)
 EDSA 25: Sulyap ng Kasaysayan (February 27, 2011)
 EDSA: 30 Taon (February 28, 2016)
 Enrique Gil: King of the Gil (February 9, 2014)
 FPJ's Ang Probinsyano: Isang Taon, Isang Selebrasyon, Isang Pasasalamat (September 28, 2016)
 FAMAS Awards (2014–2020)
 Fusion 1st Philippine Music Festival (February 22, 2015)
 Ganito Kami Muli: A Cinema One Documentary Special on the digital restoration of the movie Ganito Kami Noon, Paano Kami Ngayon? (March 16, 2014)
 Gawad Geny Lopez Jr. Bayaning Pilipino Awards (1995–2020)
  Genuine Love (August 25, 2019)
 Gullermo Mendoza Box Office Awards (2009–2020)
 Halalan: Mano-Mano o Auto, Getz Mo?: ABS-CBN Election Special (November 15, 2009)
 Hallyu and I (May 20, 2018)
 Handog ni Guy (1991)
 Harapan: The ABS-CBN & ANC Presidential Forum (December 6, 2009)
 Harapan: The ABS-CBN & ANC Vice Presidential Forum (March 2010)
 Harapan 2013: The Senatorial Debates (April 21, 28, 2013)
 Harapan 2019: The ABS-CBN Senatorial Town Hall Debate (February 17 – March 17, 2019)
 Harapan, Mga Isyu ng Bayan: The ABS-CBN and ANC Senatorial Forum (April 2010)
 Harapan ng Bise: The ABS-CBN Vice Presidential Debate (April 17, 2016)
 Here's to the Ladies: Zsa Zsa Padilla Special (1988)
 Hillary Clinton: The Manila Forum (November 13, 2009)
 Himig Handog Love Songs Grand Finals TV Special (2003)
 Himig Handog P-POP Love Songs Grand Finals TV Special (February 24, 2013)
 Himig Handog P-POP Love Songs 2016 Grand Finals Night (April 24, 2016)
 Himig Handog Sa Maka-bagong Kabataan Grand Finals TV Special (2005)
 HIV Rising (December 9, 2018)
 Hope and Winston 1 Million Pesos Sweepstakes Grand Draw TV Special (1995–2000)
 ICON The Concert (April 5, 2015)
 Isang Pamilya Tayo: FPJ's Ang Probinsyano The Anniversary Concert (November 6, 2016)
 It's My Turn: The Coney Reyes Story (January 3, 1999)
 I-Vice Ganda Mo Ko sa Araneta Concert TV Special (July 14, 2013)
 JaDine: Achieved Reel to Real (February 28, 2016)
 JaDine Flying High on Love Special (April 10−May 1, 2016)
 JaDine in Love (November 13, 2016)
 Jed Madela's 10th Anniversary Concert (August 3, 2014)
 Johnny: The Juan Ponce Enrile Story (September 23, 2012)
 Just Julia: Beautiful @ 18 (March 29, 2015)
 Kabayan Reports: Gusto Kong Mag-Aral (2013)
 Kahapon, Ngayon at Bukas: The Mar Roxas-Korina Sanchez Wedding Special (November 8, 2009)
 Kaibigan Habang Buhay: The Unilever Philippines 75th Anniversary Special (February 9, 2003)
 Kapamilya Simbang Gabi (December 16–24, 2007–2019)
 Karla: The Music Within (January 27, 2019)
 KBP Golden Dove Awards (1999)
 #Kathryn18: My 18th Birthday Vlog (April 6, 2014)
 Kidnap (2008)
 My Girl turns 18: The Kim Chiu's Birthday Special (2008)
 King of Comedy Dolphy at 80 (August 2008)
 King of the Gil: The Concert TV Special (February 9, 2014)
 Kris @ 18 (1989)
 Kris at 30: Kris Aquino's 30th Birthday Special (February 13–15, 2001)
 KZ's Soul Supremacy (October 22, 2017)
 Laban ni Cory (August 2, 2009)
 Lakwatsero sa Hokkaido: ABS-CBN News and Current Affairs Documentary Special (February 23, 2014 – January 17, 2016)
 Lakwatsero (April 28, 2019)
 Lakas Sambayanan: People Power (February 24, 2002)
 La Nightingtale: Lani Misalucha The Return Concert (May 10, 2015)
 The Last Journey of Ninoy (August 23, 2009)
 Laya: Sigaw ng Kabataan Street Party for EDSA Uno Anniversary (February 25, 2001)
 Lea Salonga: The Playlist Concert TV Special (February 16, 2014)
 Lea Salonga: Home for Christmas (2004)
 Lea Salonga's Songs from Home (2003)
 Little AZKALS (April 12, 2015)
 Local Legends (February 10, 2019)
 #LoveGoals: A Love To Last Concert (September 17, 2017)
 Mag TV Na: Pagtalubo Sa Pagtubod, Peñafrancia 2014 Special (September 21, 2013; aired on ABS-CBN Bicol)
 MMK 20: Maalaala Mo Kaya Dalawang Dekada: A Documentary TV Special (September 26, 2011)
 Man on the Moon (July 20, 1969)
 Marcos: A Malignant Spirit (1989)
 Martin Nievera XXV: The 25th Anniversary Concert (2008)
 Maricel: 22 on 2 (1991)
 Martin Nievera and Regine Velasquez World Concert Tour (2003)
 Mega Thirty: The Sharon Cuneta 30th Anniversary TV Special (2008)
 Mega Birthday 2010 Concert (January 2010)
 Mega Drama Concert (August 2010)
 Metro Manila Film Festival Awards Night 24th Metro Manila Film Festival Awards Night (December 1998)
 37th Metro Manila Film Festival Gabi ng Parangal (January 1, 2012)
 40th Metro Manila Film Festival Gabi ng Parangal (December 27, 2014)
 Mga Kwento ng Klima (November 24, 2019)
 Mga Nagbabagang Balita: 25 Taon ng TV Patrol (July 29, 2012, popular demand: August 17, 2012)
 Miss Manila 2018 (July 1, 2018)
 Miss Earth (2002–2017, 2019–2020)
 Miss Grand International 2017 (October 29, 2017)
 Miss Philippines-Earth (2002–2020)
 Mr. & Ms. Chinatown (August 7, 2016)
 My Name is Ylona Garcia Concert (September 4, 2016)
 Nakawin Natin Ang Bukas: Viva Telemovie Special (1988)
 Nestle Kasambuhay, Habambuhay: Short Film Anthology TV Special (July 10, 2011)
 No Nukes Now and Forever (September 11, 1995)
 OA: Ogie Alcasid's 30th Anniversary Concert (November 18, 2018)
 On the Wings of Love: JaDine Love The Concert Finale (February 26, 2016)
 One Night with Regine (June 2, 2002)
 Paalam Rico Yan, Mahal Naming Kapamilya (April 4, 2002)
 Paglaum: Magkasama sa Pagbangon (November 17, 2019)
 Pantawid ng Pag-ibig: At Home Together Concert (March 22, 2020) (together with S+A, DZMM Radyo Patrol 630, DZMM Teleradyo, ANC, Jeepney TV, Asianovela Channel, Metro Channel, MOR Philippines, iWant, TFC, and Myx)
 Panunumpa: The Marcos Inaugural (June 30, 2022)
 Papal Visit 1995 Special Coverage (January 10, 1995)
 PiliPinas Debates 2016: The Presidential Town Hall Debates - Luzon leg (April 24, 2016)
 Pilipinas Got Talent Grand Finals (June 2010)
 P&G Philippines 75th Anniversary TV Special (December 12, 2010)
 PBB Big Night (2005–2020)
 PBB The Big Reunion (2005–2010, 2019–2020)
 PBB Double Up: The Big Bonus (February 20, 2010)
 Pinoy Boyband Superstar: The Grand Reveal (December 10–11, 2016)
 PDA Grand Finals (2006–2008)
 Pinoy Fear Factor Grand Finale (February 2009)
 Pitumpung Pidol: Dolphy's 70th Birthday Special (July 1998)
 PMPC Star Awards for Movies (2009–2020)
 PMPC Star Awards for Music (2010–2020)
 PMPC Star Awards for Television (1988, 2009–2020)
 PMPC Star for M-TV Awards (November 20, 2016)
 Politika at Pamilya: Sila-Sila Noon, Sila-Sila Pa Rin Hanggang Ngayon (May 29, 2016)
 Poohkwang (2008)
 Probe: Ang Ating Kwento (July 18, 2010)
 Raise Your Flag for Catriona Gray (March 10, 2019)
 Rodgers and Hammerstein's Cinderella The Making (2008)
 Roses Parade (2009–2010)
 The Royal Wedding of the Century (April 29, 2011)
 Regal Rejoicing at 18 (August 24, 1991)
 Runaway: Human Trafficking sa Jordan (2008)
 Ryan Ryan Musikahan: Para sa Bayan Special (August 28, 2016)
 Lea Salonga-Robert Chien Wedding TV Special (January 23, 2004)
 Salamat, President Cory (August 1–5, 2009)
 Sandara: Ang Pambansang Krung-Krung ng Pilipinas TV Special (2005)
 Sarah Geronimo: The Great Unknown (May 28, 2017)
 Showtime Grand Finals (2009–2013)
 Sine, Laging Kasama (November 2, 2014)
 SM City North EDSA Pioneer Tenants Awards Night (November 28, 2010)
 Star Magic @ 25: The ASAP Special (May 21–28, 2017)
 Star Power Grand Finals Night (February 20, 2011)
 Story Line: People Power (2009)
 Super Janella (May 14, 2017)
 Takutan Tayo, Kaya Mo? ABS-CBN NCA Halloween Special (October 2012)
 Tayong Dalawa: The Untold Beginning (September 20, 2009)
 Te Amo Mahal: The John Estrada-Priscilla Merielles Wedding TV Special (March 13, 2011)
 Teen Power: The Kabataang Pinoy Concert Party (January 24, 2016)
 Thank You Sa Malasakit: Pope Francis sa Pilipinas (January 15–19, 2015)
 The Philippine Starball (2008)
 The Making of Barcelona: A Love Untold (September 4, 2016)
 The Miriam Defensor Santiago Story (February 2010)
 The Michael Jackson Story 1958-2009 (2009)
 The Music of Rey Valera (February 14, 2016)
 The Other Side Of Darren (February 12, 2017)
 The Royal Wedding of the Century (April 29, 2011)
 The Voice of the Philippines The Finals Night (2013)
 The Unchanging Love, Juday-Ryan Wedding Part 1 (May 17, 2009)
 Thrille Cine (2008)
 The Sharon Cuneta Christmas Special: I'll Be Home For Christmas (December 21, 1997)
 The X Factor: Season 1 Performance and Results Night Finals (December 25, 2011)
 TNT All-Star Showdown (April 21, 2019)
 TNT Boys Listen: The Big Shot Concert (March 24, 2019)
 Tulong Na, Tabang Na, Tayo Na: A Benefit Concert & Telethon for the Victims of Typhoon Yolanda  (November 17, 2013)
 Ultra Stampede Coverage (February 4, 2006)
 bench/ Uncut: A bolder look at the future (October 24, 2010)
 bench/ Universe: 25th Anniversary Denim and Underwear Show (November 18, 2012)
 Unite at The Big Night (2010)
 Vice Gandang Ganda Sa Sarili (August 9, 2015)
 Vizconde Massacre (Promulgation of the Decision) News Coverage (January 5, 2000)
 Welcome Home, Pia Wurtzbach: The Miss Universe Grand Homecoming Special (January 31, 2016)
 Wishful Journey (July 15, 2018)
 Walang Hanggang Pasasalamat Concert TV Special (October 21, 2012)
 Walang Iwanan (2008)
 Worth Dying For (1993)
 Salamat Sa 10 Taon Concert: The Yeng Constantino's Digital Concert (July 24, 2016)
 Yolanda: Ang Pagsalaysay ni Atom Araullo (December 22, 2013)
 Zoren-Carmina: Always Forever, A Wedding Like No Other TV Special (November 24, 2012)

Christmas specials
 Pasko ng Pasasalamat: The 1992 ABS-CBN Christmas Special (December 19, 1992)
 Pasko Na, Ang TV Na! (1994)
 Oki Doki Doc: The Christmas Concert TV Special (December 25, 1996)
 All-Star Christmas Celebration: The 1996 ABS-CBN Christmas Special (December 21, 1996)
 Ang Pinakamaligayang Pasko ng ABS-CBN: The 1997 ABS-CBN Christmas Special (December 20, 1997)
 Pasko sa Ating Puso: The Grand ABS-CBN Christmas Special (December 19, 1998)
 Pasko ay Pag-ibig: The 1999 ABS-CBN Christmas Special (December 18, 1999)
 A Christmas Prayer: The 2000 ABS-CBN Christmas Special (December 15, 2000)
 Sama-Sama Tayo Ngayong Pasko: The 2001 ABS-CBN Christmas Special (December 21, 2001)
 Isang Pamilya, Isang Puso Ngayong Pasko: The 2002 ABS-CBN Christmas Special (December 20, 2002)
 Once Upon a Christmas: The 2003 ABS-CBN Christmas Special (December 21, 2003)
 Sabay Tayo, Kapamilya: The 2004 ABS-CBN Christmas Special (December 19, 2004)
 Magpasaya ng Kapamilya: The 2005 ABS-CBN Christmas Special (December 17, 2005)
 Tuloy na Tuloy Pa Rin ang Pasko: The 2006 ABS-CBN Christmas Special (December 17, 2006)
 One Country, One Family, One Christmas: The 2007 ABS-CBN Christmas Special (December 16, 2007)
 Pasko Na, Kapamilya: The 2008 ABS-CBN Christmas Special (December 21, 2008)
 Kapamilyang Kapiling: The 2008 ABS-CBN 55th Anniversary Christmas Special (December 21, 2008)
 Bro, Ikaw ang Star ng Pasko: The 2009 ABS-CBN Christmas Special (December 13 and 20, 2009)
 Kapamilya, Isang Maningning na Pasko: The 2010 ABS-CBN Christmas Special (December 18–19, 2010)
 Da Best ang Pasko ng Pilipino: The 2011 ABS-CBN Christmas Special (December 17–18, 2011)
 Liwanag ng Pasko: The 2012 ABS-CBN Christmas Special (December 15–16, 2012)
 Kwento ng Pasko, Pag-asa at Pagbangon, A Solidarity Concert: The 2013 ABS-CBN Christmas Special  (December 14–15, 2013)
 Kapamilya, Magkapiling Tayo Ngayong Pasko: The 2014 ABS-CBN Christmas Special  (December 13–14, 2014)
 Thank You for the Love: The 2015 ABS-CBN Christmas Special  (December 19–20, 2015)
 Isang Pamilya Tayo Ngayong Pasko: The 2016 ABS-CBN Christmas Special  (December 17–18, 2016)
 Just Love: The 2017 ABS-CBN Christmas Special (December 16–17, 2017)
 Family is Love: The 2018 ABS-CBN Christmas Concert (December 15–16, 2018)
 Family is Forever: The 2019 ABS-CBN Christmas Special (December 14–15, 2019)

Year-end specials
 ABS-CBN Yearender: 1987 (December 27, 1987)
 1997 in Review: The ABS-CBN Current Affairs Special (December 28, 1997)
 Under Fire: The ABS-CBN Yearend Special (December 31, 2000)
 Dos Mil Dos: The ABS-CBN Yearend Special (December 29, 2002)
 Banta at Paghamon: The ABS-CBN Yearend Special (December 28, 2003)
 Kumusta Ka Na, Kaya Pa Ba? The ABS-CBN Yearend Special (December 26, 2004)
 Bagong Taon, Bagong Buhay: The ABS-CBN Yearend Special (December 25, 2005)
 Ako ang Simula: The ABS-CBN Yearend Special (December 31, 2006)
 Ang Bayan Ko: The ABS-CBN Yearend Special (December 30, 2007)
 2008 Upload: The ABS-CBN Yearend Special (December 28, 2008)
 Shoutout 2009: Wagi o Sawi? The ABS-CBN Yearend Special (December 27, 2009)
 Si Juan at ang mga Kuwento ng Bayan: The 2010 ABS-CBN Yearend Special (December 26, 2010)
 Dos Mil Onse: ABS-CBN News Year End Special (December 31, 2011 – January 1, 2012)
 Sandosenang Balita ng 2012: Yearender ng Bayan: The 2012 ABS-CBN Yearend Special (December 30, 2012)
 Ulo ng mga Balita 2013: The ABS-CBN News Yearend Report (December 29, 2013)
 #Trending2014: The ABS-CBN News Year-End Report (December 28, 2014)
 #2015Yearender: The ABS-CBN News Year-End Special (December 27, 2015)
 Usapang Bayan: 2016 ABS-CBN News Year-End Special (December 31, 2016)
 Paglayang Minamahal: 2017 ABS-CBN News Year-End Special (December 31, 2017)
 Sa Likod ng Balita: 2018 ABS-CBN News Year-End Special (December 28, 2018)
 Sa Likod ng Balita: The ABS-CBN 2019 Year-End Special (December 29, 2019)

New Year specials
 Happy New Year 1996 (December 31, 1995 – January 1, 1996)
 Welcome the Philippine Tiger: Happy New Year 1997 (December 31, 1996 – January 1, 1997)
 Expo Pilipino Bingo: The 1998 Filipino Extravaganza (December 31, 1997 –  January 1, 1998)
 Happy New Year 1999 / Countdown to 1999 (December 31, 1998 –  January 1, 1999)
 ABS-CBN Worldwide Celebration of the New Millennium TV Special (December 31, 1999 – January 1, 2000)
 Countdown to 2001: The Weekend News Special Edition (December 31, 2000 –  January 1, 2001)
 Countdown to 2002: The Correspondents Special Edition (December 31, 2001 –  January 1, 2002)
 Countdown to 2003: Pipol and Dong Puno Nightly Special Crossover Edition (December 31, 2002 –  January 1, 2003)
 Countdown to 2004: A Special New Year Assignment (December 31, 2003 –  January 1, 2004)
 Countdown to 2005 (December 31, 2004 –  January 1, 2005)
 Maligayang Bagong Taon 2006 / Salubong sa Taong 2006: The ABS-CBN News Patrol Special Edition (December 31, 2005 –  January 1, 2006)
 Pagsalubong sa 2007 (December 31, 2006 –  January 1, 2007)
 Bandila New Year's Countdown Special Edition 
 Countdown to 2008: (December 31, 2007 – January 1, 2008)
 Countdown to 2009: (December 31, 2008 - January 1, 2009)
 Bida Best sa Bagong Taon Special Coverage Countdown 2011: (December 31, 2010 –  January 1, 2011)
 Countdown to 2013: (December 31, 2012 – January 1, 2013)
 Salubong sa Bagong Simula: ABS-CBN Countdown to 2010 (December 31, 2009 – January 1, 2010)
 Salubong sa 2012: The ABS-CBN New Year Countdown Special (December 31, 2011 – January 1, 2012)
 Salubong sa 2014: The ABS-CBN New Year Countdown Special (December 31, 2013 – January 1, 2014)
 Salubong 2015: The ABS-CBN New Year Countdown Special (December 31, 2014 – January 1, 2015)
 Salubong 2016: The ABS-CBN New Year Countdown Special (December 31, 2015 – January 1, 2016)
 Salubong 2017: The ABS-CBN New Year Countdown Special (December 31, 2016 – January 1, 2017)
 Salubong 2018: The ABS-CBN New Year Countdown Special (December 31, 2017 – January 1, 2018)
 Salubong 2019: The ABS-CBN New Year Countdown Special (December 31, 2018 – January 1, 2019)
 2020 Rising: The BGC Taguig New Year Countdown Live @ ABS-CBN (December 31, 2019 – January 1, 2020)

Anniversary / produced specials
 Quirino's Garden Party (October 23, 1953)
 We're Back!!: The ABS-CBN Homecoming (September 14, 1986)
 The Star Network: Ang Pagbabalik Ng Bituin (March 1, 1987)
 Eat Bulaga's 10th Anniversary Special live! at the Araneta Coliseum (September 23, 1989)
 Eat Bulaga's 11th Anniversary Special (1990)
 Eat Bulaga's 12th Anniversary Special live! at the Folk Arts Theater (August 12, 1991)
 Eat Bulaga's 13th Anniversary Special (1992)
 Eat Bulaga's 14th Anniversary Special (1993)
 Eat Bulaga's 15th Anniversary Special (1994)
 Ang TV: Isang Taon Na! (TV Special) (1993)
 ABS-CBN @ 40: The ABS-CBN 40th Years TV Special (October 23, 1993)
 A Grand Salute: 40 Years of Philippine Television and ABS-CBN (December 18, 1993)
 Oki Doki Doc's 1st Anniversary TV Special (1994) ABS-CBN 50 Golden Years Along da Riles (June 13, 1996)
 ABS-CBN Homecoming Special (August 30, 2003)
 Sa Mata Ng Balita (October 12, 2003)
 Limampung Taong Ligawan: The Pinoy TV Story (October 19, 2003)
 Kapamilya: ABS-CBN @ 50 2-Part Extravaganza (October 26 – November 2, 2003)
 Isang Mundo, Isang Estasyon, Isang Kapamilya: ABS-CBN @ 55 2-Part Special (October 23, 2008)
 Kapamilyang Kapiling: The ABS-CBN 55th Anniversary Christmas Special (December 2008)
 It's Showtime: ABS-CBN 60 Years of Philippine Television Special (October 5, 2013)
 ASAP 18: ABS-CBN 60 Years of Philippine Television Special (October 6, 2013)
 Kanta Natin 'To!: A Celebration of 60 Years of Music (October 5–6, 2013)
 Oki Doki Doc: Best of Comedy TV Special (June 12, 1996)Holy Week specials
 The 700 Club Holy Week Special (1995)
 A.D. The Bible Continues (April 20, 2019)
 Adoration/Veneration of the Cross (produced by The Healing Eucharist Inc., 2009–2020)
 Animazing Tales (April 17–19, 2014; April 13–15, 2017)
 Agua Bendita: Lenten Special (April 1–3, 2010)
 Ang Aming Mga Sala (produced by JESCOM, April 2–3, 2010)
 Ang Mabuting Pastol: Pope Francis sa Pilipinas (March 25, 2016)
 Ang Makabagong Disipulo (produced by JESCOM, April 5, 2012)
 Ang Pinakabanal Na Tao Ng Simbahan: A Jesuits Lenten TV Special (April 11, 2009)
 Ang Pitong Huling Wika ni Hesus (March 21, 2008)
 Ako at ang Santo Papa (March 25, 2016)
 Awa, Unawa, Gawa: Reflections and Stories on the Corporal Works of Mercy (produced by JESCOM, March 24, 2016)
 Bagong Buhay: Mga Kwento Ng Pagbabalik-Loob (produced by JESCOM, March 28, 2013)
 Be Careful with My Heart Marathon (March 28–30, 2013)
 Catholicism Series by Robert Barron (April 2–4, 2015)
 Charity Man (April 21–22, 2011)
 Come Follow Me: Moments with Fr. Jerry Orbos Special (March 29, 2018)
 Dyesebel: The Tale of the Tail, A Special Marathon (April 19, 2014)
 Eat Bulaga!: Lenten Drama Specials (1989–1994, produced by TAPE Inc.) 
 Nang Si Hudas ay Nadulas (March 25–27, 1991)
 Angkan ni David (April 13–15, 1992)
 Tatlong Makasalanan (April 5–7, 1993)
 Experiencing the Holy Land (April 17, 2014)
 Faithwalk: A Pilgrimage to Egypt, Jordan and Holy Land (April 18, 2014 (nationwide), April 19, 2014 (Channel 3 Cebu))
 Found By Love: A Jesuits Lenten TV Special (April 11, 2009)
 Goin Bulilit Lenten Special Presents: The Prodigal Son (April 2014)
 Greater Love: In Memory of Richie Fernando: A Jesuits Lenten TV Special (2005)
 Ikaw Lamang: Special Marathon (April 19, 2014)
 In My Father's Arms (produced by CBN Asia, April 14, 2017)
 It's Showtime: Holy Week Drama Specials (2013–2020)
 Jesus In The Heart Of Mary Two-part Documentary (produced by Moments with Father Jerry Foundation, 2011)
 Journey to God's Heart with Fr. Jerry Orbos, SVD (produced by Moments with Father Jerry Foundation, April 17–18, 2014)
 Forgiveness: The Heart of Grace and Transformational Power of Receiving: Fr. Jerry Orbos (March 24–25, 2016)
 Francisco: Pray For Us (April 13, 2017)
 Fully Alive: Fr. Jerry Orbos (April 13, 2017)
 I Am Patrick: Patron Saint of Ireland (Produced by CBN Asia, April 10, 2020)
 Kalatog Pinggan Holy Week Specials (1987–1988)
 Kalbaryo: Saan patungo ang iyong pagdurusa? (produced by JESCOM, April 17, 2014)
 Kunin Mo, O Diyos: A Jesuits Lenten TV Special (2006)
 Lenten Recollection (April 5, 2015)
 Lenten Special: On A Road Less Travelled (April 5, 2012)
 Liwanag Sa Dilim: A Jesuits Lenten TV Special (April 22, 2011)
 Kwento ng mga Peregrino: A Jesuits Lenten TV Special (April 10, 2009)
 Maalaala Mo Kaya: Holy Week Specials (1999–2015)
 Magandang Tanghali Bayan: Holy Week Drama Specials (1999–2004)
 Maging Akin Muli (produced by JESCOM, 2005, re-aired 2016)
 May Bukas Pa: Lenten Special (April 9–11, 2009)
 Mga Kuwento Mula sa Lupang Pangako: Ang Makabagong Desipulo (produced by JESCOM, April 6, 2012)
 Mga Kuwento Mula sa Lupang Pangako: Sa Mga Yapak ni Hesus (produced by JESCOM, April 5, 2012; re-aired 2015)
 Mga Huling Sandali sa Buhay ni Hesus: A Jesuits Lenten TV Special (2005)
 Minsan Lang Kita Iibigin: Marathon Special (April 21–23, 2011)
 Mula sa Puso: Lenten Special (April 21–23, 2011)
 My Suffering is My Offering (produced by Moments with Father Jerry Foundation, April 18, 2019)
 My Love, Donna Catch-Up Marathon Special (March 26, 2016)
 New Life: Fr. Jerry Orbos (April 14, 2017)
 Oh My G!: Special Marathon (April 4, 2015) 
 Ordination of the Priest Centennial Documentary Special (April 21, 2011)
 Panata: A Jesuits Lenten TV Special (April 6, 2007)
 PasaSALAMAT: Stories Of People, Paying It Forward (produced by JESCOM, April 2, 2015)
 Pope of the Century (April 19, 2014)
 Pope of The People (April 23, 2011)
 Preacher in Blue Jeans (April 5, 2007)
 Sang Linggo nAPO Sila Holy Week Drama Special (1995–1998)
 Sangandaan: Paghahanap kay Hesus sa Camino Ignaciano (produced by JESCOM, March 30, 2018)
 San Pedro Calungsod Documentary Special (March 29, 2013)
 Seven Last Words (Good Friday, 1960–1972, 1987–2004; produced by MCFI, 2006–2020)
 Stations of the Cross: Lenten Recollection On Air (produced by The Healing Eucharist Inc., 2012–2016)
 Sumasampalataya Ako: Pagninilay sa Ganda ng Ating Pananampalataya (produced by JESCOM, April 19, 2019)
 The Bible  (April 17–19, 2014; April 13–15, 2017; March 29–31, 2018; April 18–19, 2019; April 9–11, 2020)
 The Chronicles of Narnia Trilogy (April 9–11, 2020)
 The Healing Eucharist Celebration of the Lord's Supper (2009–2020)
 Veneration of the Cross (2009–2020)
 Easter Vigil (2009–2020)
 The Hobbit Trilogy (April 18–20, 2019)
 The Lord of the Rings Trilogy (March 29–31, 2018)
 The Pope from the End of the World (April 3, 2015)
 The Story of Us Marathon (March 25, 2016)
 We Will Survive Marathon Special (March 24, 2016)
 Wanda's Wonderful World (produced by CBN Asia, March 30, 2018)
 Wansapanataym: Holy Week Marathon (March 28–30, 2013)
 Wansapanataym: Petrang Peminta Marathon (March 26, 2016)
 Witnessing The Light (2010)

Kapamilya Channel / A2Z

Christmas specials
 Andito Tayo Para sa Isa't Isa: The ABS-CBN Christmas Special 2021 (December 18, 2021)1
 Ikaw ang Liwanag at Ligaya: The 2020 ABS-CBN Christmas Special (December 20, 2020)1
 Tayo ang Ligaya ng Isa't Isa: The ABS-CBN Christmas Special 2022 (December 17–18, 2022)6

Holy Week specials
Kapamilya Channel
 Because I Love You (April 15, 2022)
 Bernie the Dolphin (April 3, 2021)
 Between Maybes (April 15, 2022)
 Breathe (April 1, 2021)
 Cinderella and the Secret Prince (April 15, 2022)
 Crazy Beautiful You (April 14, 2022)
 Everything About Her (April 15, 2022)
 Fall in Love at First Kiss (April 3, 2021)
 Five Feet Apart (April 14, 2022)
 Four Sisters and a Wedding (April 1, 2021)
 Free Willy (April 15, 2022)
 Green Book (April 14, 2022)
 Guardians of the Tomb (April 14, 2022)
 Hello World (April 14, 2022; re-aired on November 13, 2022, on A2Z)
 Hello, Love, Goodbye (April 1, 2021)
 Huwag Kang Mangamba: The Holy Week Special (April 2, 2021)
 Love You to the Stars and Back (April 15, 2022)
 Maquia: When the Promised Flower Blooms (April 1, 2021)
 Maybe This Time (April 15, 2022)
 Mia and the White Lion (April 2, 2021)
 My Ex and Whys (April 16, 2022)
 Nine Lives (April 1, 2021)
 Playmobil: The Movie (April 15, 2022)
 Papa Francisco: The Pope Francis Story (April 2, 2021)
 Princess DayaReese (April 14, 2022)
 Robin Hood (April 3, 2021)
 Samson (April 1, 2021)
 Seven Sundays (April 14, 2022)
 Seventh Son (April 1, 2021)
 The Bible (2021–2022)
 The Mummy (April 3, 2021)
 Train to Busan (April 3, 2021)
 Vanguard (April 15, 2022)
 Weathering with You (April 3, 2021)
 Wonder (April 2, 2021)
 X-Men: Apocalypse (April 3, 2021)
 X-Men: Days of Future Past (April 2, 2021)
 X-Men: First Class (April 1, 2022)
 Your Lie in April (April 15, 2022)
 Your Name (April 2, 2021)
 James and Pat and Dave (April 15, 2022)
 Little Witch (April 14, 2022)
 Richard Says Goodbye (April 15, 2022)
 Robo-Dog: Airbone (April 15, 2022)
 Seven Last Words (2021–present)
 The Healing Eucharist Celebration of the Lord's Supper (2021–present)
 Easter Vigil (2021–present)
 Veneration of the Cross (2021–present)
 The Mystery of the Dragon Seal (April 15, 2022)
 The Night of Shadows (April 14, 2022)

Kapamilya Online Live

International events
 Binibining Pilipinas 2021 (July 11, 2021)2
 Binibining Pilipinas 2022 (July 31, 2022)2
 Miss Philippines Earth 2022 (August 7, 2022)4
 Miss Universe 2020 (May 16, 2021)4
 Miss Universe 2021 (December 13, 2021)4
 Miss Universe 2022 (January 15, 2023)2

Election coverage
 Halalan 2022: The ABS-CBN News Special Coverage (May 9–10, 2022)1

New Year specials
 Salubong 2023: The ABS-CBN New Year Countdown Special (December 31, 2022 – January 1, 2023)6

Sports coverage
 Manny Pacquiao fights
 vs. Yordenis Ugás (August 22, 2021)2
 UAAP Finals1
 UAAP Season 84 Men's Basketball Finals: Ateneo Vs. UP Game 3 (May 13, 2022)
 UAAP Season 84 Women's Volleyball Finals: NU Vs. DLSU Game 2 (June 21, 2022)
 UAAP Season 85 Men's Basketball Finals: UP Vs. Ateneo Game 3 (December 19, 2022)

Specials
 Panata Sa Bayan: The KBP Presidential Candidates Forum (February 4, 2022)4
 Panunumpa: The Marcos Inaugural: The ABS-CBN News Special Coverage (June 30, 2022)2
 State of the Nation Address 2022: The ABS-CBN News Special Coverage (July 25, 2022)2

TV specials
 Anim na Dekada... Nag-iisang Vilma (February 18 & 19, 2023)6
 ASAP Natin 'To: Kapamilya Forever Day (July 11, 2021)6
 Binibining Pilipinas (2021–2022)2
 MMK: Grand Kumustahan (December 24, 2022)1
 Christmas and New Year Healing Eucharist Mass (December 25, 2020 – present ; January 1, 2021 – present)5
 Pinoy Big Brother: The Big Night (2021–2022)1

Year-end specials
 Sa Likod ng Balita: The ABS-CBN 2020 Year-end Special (December 27, 2020)3
 Sa Likod ng Balita: The ABS-CBN 2021 Year-end Special (December 26, 2021)3
 Sa Likod ng Balita: The ABS-CBN 2022 Year-end Special'' (December 31, 2022 – January 1, 2023)1

See also
List of programs distributed by ABS-CBN

Notes

References

ABS-CBN